Choate House is a historic house on Choate Island in the Crane Wildlife Refuge, Essex, Massachusetts, owned and administered by the nonprofit Trustees of Reservations.

Choate House was built around 1730, was the birthplace of lawyer and public citizen Rufus Choate (1799–1859), and has remained virtually unchanged for over two centuries. It stands on Hog Island, also called Choate Island, and is accessible only by boat.

References

Houses completed in 1730
The Trustees of Reservations
 
Houses in Essex, Massachusetts
1730 establishments in Massachusetts